The 2018 Philippine National Games was the sixth edition in the modern era (ninth overall) of the Philippine National Games. It was co-hosted by the City of Cebu and the Province of Cebu, Philippines from May 19 to 25, 2018. The games will be organized by the Philippine Sports Commission.

This edition marks the first time in 20 years that Cebu will be hosting the games. The province first hosted the games in 1997.

It was first scheduled for December 10–16, 2017, but rescheduled on April 15–21, 2018, and later moved to May 19–25, 2018.

Host selection
There was no bidding held, and Cebu City and Cebu Province were both awarded the hosting rights outright after an impromptu meeting called for by the Philippine Sports Commission and the Philippine Olympic Committee, where the topic of the hosting of the next PNG was brought up.

Venues

Majority of the venues were held in Cebu City with selected events hosted in other cities and towns in Cebu province.

The Games

Opening ceremony
President Rodrigo Duterte formally commenced the games during the opening ceremony of the 2018 Philippine National Games at the Cebu City Sports Complex held on May 19, 2018. The competition proper began the day after.

Participating teams
A total of 92 local government units (provinces and independent cities) participated in the Games.

Sports
A total of 19 sports were contested.

Medal table
The local government unit of Cebu City was named as the overall champions of the Philippine National Games surpassing the performance of Baguio which were the champions of the 2016 edition. A total of 2,578 medals, including 770 gold medals, 770 silver medals and 1,038 bronze medals in 19 disciplines were contested.
Key
 Host LGU (Cebu Province and Cebu City)

References

External links
 2017 Philippine National Games and Batang Pinoy

PNG
PNG
Sports in Cebu
Philippine National Games
May 2018 sports events in the Philippines